Ekaterina Bolshova (born 4 February 1988, in Saint Petersburg) is a Russian heptathlete.

Her personal best in the indoor pentathlon is 4896 points, achieved in February 2012 while winning the Russian title. This ranked her fifth on the all-time lists. In heptathlon her personal best result is 5738, achieved in May 2005 in Daegu. Bolshova got sixth place at 2012 World Indoor Championships and came fifth in the heptathlon at the 2012 European Athletics Championships.

She won the Russian indoor title a second time in February 2013 and recorded a total of  points, including personal bests of 6.57 m in the long jump and 2:10.52 minutes in the 800 metres.

Achievements

References

External links 
 

1988 births
Living people
Russian heptathletes
Athletes from Saint Petersburg